The Immigration Restriction Act 1901 (Cth) was an Act of the Parliament of Australia which limited immigration to Australia and formed the basis of the White Australia policy which sought to exclude all non-Europeans from Australia. The law granted immigration officers a wide degree of discretion to prevent individuals from entering Australia. The Act prohibited various classes of people from immigrating and provided for illegal immigrants to be deported.

Because of opposition from the British government, a more explicit racial policy was avoided in the legislation, with the control mechanism for people deemed undesirable being a dictation test, which required a person seeking entry to Australia to write out a passage of fifty words dictated to them in any European language, not necessarily English, at the discretion of an immigration officer. The test was not designed to allow immigration officers to evaluate applicants on the basis of language skills, rather the language chosen was always one known beforehand that the person would fail. The initial bill was based on similar legislation in South Africa.

The Act was replaced by the Migration Act 1958.

The Act

Dictation test
The Act provided that any would-be immigrant could be subjected to a 50-word dictation test. "Any person who when asked to do so by an officer fails to write out at dictation and sign in the presence of the officer a passage of fifty words in length in a European language directed by the officer"  was deemed a "prohibited immigrant" and was to be prevented from landing.

This was similar to tests previously used in Western Australia, New South Wales and Tasmania. It enabled immigration officials to exclude individuals on the basis of race without explicitly saying so. After 1903 the passage chosen was not important in itself as it was already decided the person could not enter Australia and so failure was inevitable. Although the test could theoretically be given to any person arriving in Australia, in practice it was given selectively on the basis of race, and others considered undesirables. Between 1902 and 1909, 52 people passed the test out of 1,359 who were given it.

Offences
The Act established a range of federal crimes relating to immigration. Illegal immigrants could be imprisoned for up to six months and then could be deported. Both the captain and the owners of ships which transported illegal immigrants to Australia could be fined GBP 100 for each immigrant, unless the immigrant was European. The Minister for Foreign Affairs was also able to detain ships which were suspected of carrying illegal immigrants. People who brought ill or insane immigrants into Australia were also liable for the costs of caring for them, on top of other penalties.

Controversies
The dictation test came into disrepute when it began to be used to exclude and deport individuals which the government considered undesirable.

Jewish political activist Egon Kisch from Czechoslovakia, who was exiled from Germany for opposing Nazism, arrived in Australia in 1934. The Government of Joseph Lyons went to extraordinary lengths to exclude Kisch, including using the dictation test. Kisch was fluent in a number of European languages and, after completing passages in several, was finally failed when he declined to be tested in Scottish Gaelic. The officer who tested him had grown up in northern Scotland but did not have a particularly good grasp of Scottish Gaelic himself. In the High Court case of R v Wilson; ex parte Kisch, the court found that Scottish Gaelic was not within the fair meaning of the Act, and overturned Kisch's convictions for being an illegal immigrant. The failure to exclude Kisch brought the dictation test into widespread public ridicule.

In 1936, the dictation test was controversially used again to exclude Mabel Freer, a white British woman born in India. She was twice set the test in Italian, which she failed. In the face of a long press and legal campaign for her admission, the government was unable or unwilling to provide a convincing reason for her exclusion and eventually she was admitted, welcomed by a huge crowd at the quay in Sydney. Interior Minister Thomas Paterson resigned from the Lyons Cabinet in 1937 as a result of the controversy.

Amendments
At first the dictation test had to be given in any European language and the dictation test could be administered any time within the first year of a person's arrival to Australia. In 1905 the Act was amended so that the dictation could be submitted in "any prescribed language", the restriction to European languages remaining active until such prescribed language be chosen by the Parliament. This wording was used to placate the objection from Japan that only European languages could be used. As the Parliament never prescribed any language, the dictation case remained limited to European languages only—and more specifically to the main language of any European nation, as illustrated in the infamous attempted exclusion of Egon Kisch from Australia.

In 1932 the period during which the test could be given was extended to the first five years of residence and officials could give the test to an individual an unlimited number of times.

The Act was replaced by the Migration Act 1958, which replaced the dictation test with a universal visa system (or entry permits), and removed many of the other restrictions, although many migrants from southern Europe and Asia were already living in Australia, some of them having arrived as refugees during or after World War II.

See also
 George Kwok Bew, an anti Act campaigner
 War-time Refugees Removal Act 1949
 Migration Act 1958

References

Citations

Notes

Bibliography

Further reading
  Real examples to see if you can pass the test.
 
 

1901 in Australian law
History of immigration to Australia
Australian migration law
1901 in international relations
Immigration legislation
Repealed Acts of the Parliament of Australia
White Australia policy